"Lovesong" is a song written by American-Australian singer Amiel and produced by Josh Abrahams for Amiel's album, Audio Out (2003). It was released as the album's first single in Australia as a CD single on 10 March 2003. The song was nominated for two awards at the 2003 ARIA Awards: Highest Selling Single and Single of the Year.

The video shows a split screen of Amiel and a man who both enter a restaurant and sit down. Part way through, they both go to the bathroom and end up coming out on the opposite side of the screen and finish sitting at each other's seat and being brought the other's meal.

Background and commercial performance
Amiel wrote the song in 1999 when she first moved to Sydney, New South Wales. She states "I went out with this guy, it was three dates, just dinners, it was so irrelevant, it was completely nothing. I was new in town and I wanted something, someone. But it was a waste of time. I thought: great, all I got out of that was a love song, another fucking love song." Amiel states that the lyrics were changed to "stupid Lovesong" for radio because "stupid" preserves the sentiment better than a beep.

"Lovesong" was commercially successful in Australia. On its first week of release to radio, it became the most added song to Australian radio for that week. In March 2003, it debuted at number 13 on the Australian ARIA Singles Chart, and within five weeks of its release, it had reached the top 10, becoming Amiel's first top-10 single. The single spent 26 weeks on the ARIA Singles Chart, 17 of which were in the top 50. The song went to become Australia's 34th-highest-selling single for 2003, and the Australian Recording Industry Association (ARIA) awarded the single a platinum certification for shipping 70,000 copies. The same year, the song was nominated for two ARIA Awards: the Highest Selling Single and Single of the Year, losing in both categories to "Born to Try" by Delta Goodrem.

Track listings
Australian CD single
 "Lovesong"
 "Lovesong" (censored)
 "Lovesong" (MONUMENT remix)
 "Games We Play"

Germany CD single
 "Lovesong" — 3:32
 "Lovesong" (censored radio version) — 3:33
 "Lovesong" (Scumfrog remix edit) — 3:47
 "Lovesong" (Scumfrog club mix) — 8:39
 "Lovesong" (video) — 3:32

Charts

Weekly charts

Year-end charts

Certifications

Release history

References

2003 singles
APRA Award winners
Festival Records singles
Ministry of Sound singles